The discography of British singer-songwriter Gabrielle Aplin, consists of four studio albums, seven extended plays, three live albums and sixteen singles. Her first release was the 5-track Acoustic EP which was released on the iTunes Store on 13 September 2010. Her second EP Never Fade was released on 9 May 2011 and saw Aplin expand her sound, showcasing a more folk rock sound and playing all instruments herself. In April 2011, Aplin was invited to perform for BBC Introducing at Maida Vale Studios, where she played 3 tracks from Never Fade and a cover of the Coldplay song "Fix You". Aplin released her third EP, Home, on 9 January 2012. On 29 February 2012, Aplin announced that she had signed to Parlophone. Aplin was confirmed as the soundtrack to the John Lewis 2012 Christmas television advertisement, covering Frankie Goes to Hollywood's "The Power of Love", the song reached number one on the UK Singles Chart.

On 12 December 2012, Aplin announced that the title of her debut album would be English Rain. In addition, she also unveiled its artwork and release date of 29 April 2013. However, the album's release date was later confirmed as 13 May 2013. Aplin announced live on 17 February Radio 1 Chart Show that her third single would be "Panic Cord". The song originally featured on her Never Fade EP and it was released on 5 May 2013, charting at number 19 on the UK Singles Chart. English Rain charted at number 2 on both the UK Albums Chart and Scottish Albums Chart, while reaching number on the Irish Albums Chart. In 2014, Aplin released her English Rain EP in the United States. The EP was released on 6 May and features 5 songs from her debut album, as well as a cover of Canadian singer Joni Mitchell's "A Case of You". In 2015, Aplin released her second studio album entitled Light Up the Dark. Light Up the Dark debuted at number 14 on the UK Albums Chart.

Albums

Studio albums

Live albums

Extended plays

Singles

As lead artist

As featured artist

Other appearances

Music videos

References

Notes

Sources

Pop music discographies
Discographies of British artists
discography